The Greek island of Crete is home to several airports, both public and military.

List

See also
List of airports in Greece

External links

Hellenic Civil Aviation Authority

Crete
 
Transport in Crete
Crete-related lists